Comitas subsuturalis is a species of sea snail, a marine gastropod mollusk in the family Pseudomelatomidae, the turrids and allies.

Distribution
This marine species occurs off East Africa and Zanzibar

References

External links
 Specimen at MNHN, Paris
 
 Biolib.cz: Comitas subsuturalis

subsuturalis
Taxa named by Eduard von Martens
Gastropods described in 1902